The 1992 Champion Hurdle was a horse race held at Cheltenham Racecourse on Tuesday 10 March 1992. It was the 63rd running of the Champion Hurdle.

The winner was Sheikh Mohammed's Royal Gait, a nine-year-old bay gelding trained in Suffolk by James Fanshawe and ridden by Graham McCourt. Royal Gait's victory was a first in the race for jockey and trainer, and a second for the owner who had won the 1990 running with Kribensis.

Royal Gait had been an outstanding stayer on the flat winning the Group One Prix du Cadran and Prix Royal Oak in 1987 and being controversially disqualified after finishing first in the 1988 Ascot Gold Cup. On what was only his fourth race over hurdles he started at odds of 6/1 and won the Champion Hurdle by half a length and a short head from Oh So Risky and Ruling. Two previous winners of the race, Morley Street and Kribensis took part: Morley Street was made the 2/1 favourite and finished sixth whilst Kribensis finished last. The second favourite Granville Again fell at the penultimate hurdle. Fourteen of the sixteen runners completed the course.

Race details
 Sponsor: Smurfit
 Purse: £133,661; First prize: £80,065
 Going: Good
 Distance: 2 miles
 Number of runners: 16
 Winner's time: 3m 57.40

Full result

 Abbreviations: nse = nose; nk = neck; hd = head; dist = distance; UR = unseated rider; PU = pulled up; LFT = left at start; SU = slipped up; BD = brought down

Winner's details
Further details of the winner, Royal Gait
 Sex: Gelding
 Foaled: 12 April 1983
 Country: United Kingdom
 Sire: Gunner B; Dam: High Gait (High Top)
 Owner: Sheikh Mohammed
 Breeder: Ian H Wills

References

Champion Hurdle
 1992
Champion Hurdle
Champion Hurdle
1990s in Gloucestershire